Central Railroad of Indianapolis  is a Class III short-line railroad that operates approximately  miles of rail line in north central Indiana.

One leg of the railroad begins near Marion at the unincorporated town of Michaelsville, passes west-southwest through Herbst, Swayzee and Sims, then through the Howard County communities of Sycamore, Greentown, and finally Kokomo, where it interchanges with U.S. Rail Corporation's Winamac Southern Rail System.

Central Railroad of Indianapolis is a subsidiary of Genesee & Wyoming. G&W had purchased the RailAmerica empire in 2012. RailAmerica had itself bought CERA and then parent Railtex in 2000.
CERA was formed in 1989 when Norfolk Southern leased several lines, including the now mostly-abandoned Tipton-Peru line and the Marion to Frankfort former "Cloverleaf" line to the then-new company through NS's "Thoroughbred Shortline program.  For a time, Norfolk Southern interchanged with CERA via its Frankfort to Kokomo line.  The latter route was embargoed after the Norfolk Southern Conrail merger allowed Norfolk Southern to move CERA interchange to Marion.

The railroad's main traffic comes from grain and metal products. The CERA hauled around 8,000 carloads in 2008.

References

External links

2021 Indiana Rail System Map 
Central Railroad of Indianapolis (CERA)

Indiana railroads
Transportation in Grant County, Indiana
Transportation in Howard County, Indiana
Transportation in Miami County, Indiana
RailAmerica
Spin-offs of the Norfolk Southern Railway